Alessio di Mauro (born 9 August 1977) is a former professional tennis player from Italy. During his career, he reached the final of one ATP tournament, the 2007 ATP Buenos Aires. On 26 February 2007 the left-hander reached his career high ranking of world no. 68.

Betting scandal
On 10 November 2007, at a position of world no. 124, di Mauro was the first player to be sanctioned after being embroiled in a betting scandal. Di Mauro received a $60,000 (£29,000) fine and 9 months banning from the ATP Tour for an offense that carried a maximum punishment of three years. Some officials called for a harsher punishment. However, di Mauro was not betting on the outcome of his own matches nor did he attempt to influence the outcomes of matches. He was found to be betting from 2 November 2006 to 12 June 12, 2007, and was caught as a result of an investigation beginning in April 2007.

ATP career finals

Singles: 1 (1 runner-up)

ATP Challenger and ITF Futures finals

Singles: 28 (13–15)

Doubles: 22 (9–13)

References

External links
 
 
 

1977 births
Living people
Italian male tennis players
People from Syracuse, Sicily
Sportspeople involved in betting scandals
Tennis controversies
Match fixing in tennis
Sportspeople from the Province of Syracuse